Professor John Danwell Kalenga Saka is the current Vice-Chancellor of  Mzuzu University who replaced Dr.Robert Ridley who withdrew his services in 2017.

Saka was also the former Vice-Chancellor of the University of Malawi who preceded   Professor Mkali Idruss Samson Sajidu.

He was born in Malawi and educated at Chancellor College, University of Malawi and the University of East Anglia (PhD, Chemistry). He subsequently became lecturer in Physical Chemistry at the University of Malawi in 1986 where he became a Professor in 2002. He was installed as Vice-Chancellor of the University of Malawi on 2 December 2013. He is also chairperson of the Malawi National Examinations Board.

References

Year of birth missing (living people)
Living people
University of Malawi alumni
Alumni of the University of East Anglia
Academic staff of the University of Malawi
Malawian chemists
Vice-chancellors of universities in Malawi